The D-T oil field is an oil field located on the continental shelf of the Black Sea. It was discovered in 2010 and developed by Sterling Resources. It will begin production in 2018 and will produce oil.

References

Black Sea energy
Oil fields in Romania